Amydrium medium is a flowering plant in genus Amydrium of the arum family, Araceae.

Distribution 
its native range is Thailand, Myanmar, Cambodia, Malaysia, Singapore, Some Indonesian islands and the Philippines.

References 

Monsteroideae